KFHC (88.1 FM) is a radio station broadcasting a Religious music format. Licensed to Ponca, Nebraska, U.S.  The station is currently owned by St. Gabriel Communications Ltd.

References

External links
 

FHC
Catholic radio stations
Radio stations established in 1984
Dixon County, Nebraska
1984 establishments in Nebraska
Catholic Church in Nebraska